Defending champion Rafael Nadal defeated Dominic Thiem in the final, 6–4, 6–3, 6–2 to win the men's singles tennis title at the 2018 French Open. It was his record-extending eleventh French Open title and 17th major title overall. Nadal equaled Margaret Court's all-time record of 11 singles titles won at one major and became the first player to achieve that feat in the Open Era. He lost only one set during the tournament, and retained the world No. 1 singles ranking. Nadal and Roger Federer (despite having withdrawn from the clay season) were in contention for the top ranking.	

With Alexander Zverev as the second seed, this was the first time since the 2006 Australian Open that a player outside of the Big Four was one of the top two seeds at a major.

Novak Djokovic was attempting to become the first man in the Open Era to achieve a double career Grand Slam, but he lost in the quarterfinals to Marco Cecchinato. Djokovic's loss ensured a first time major finalist from the bottom half of the draw; Thiem emerged to be that player, and became the first Austrian player to reach a major singles final since Thomas Muster at the 1995 French Open.

Cecchinato, ranked 72nd and having failed to win a main draw match in his four previous major appearances, became the first unseeded men's singles semifinalist at the French Open since Gaël Monfils in 2008, the lowest-ranked male singles player to reach the French Open semifinals since Andriy Medvedev in 1999, and the first Italian man to reach a major singles semifinal since Corrado Barazzutti at the 1978 French Open.

Seeds
All seedings per ATP rankings.

Qualifying

Draw

Finals

Top half

Section 1

Section 2

Section 3

Section 4

Bottom half

Section 5

Section 6

Section 7

Section 8

References 
Roland Garros 2018 Men's Singles Draw

External links
2018 French Open – Men's draws and results at the International Tennis Federation

Men's Singles
French Open by year – Men's singles
French Open - Men's Singles